Wereham is a small village and civil parish in the English county of Norfolk.

Location
Wereham lies in the Wissey valley and is on the main A134 road; it is some five miles to the east of the town of Downham Market and thirteen miles from King's Lynn. Neighbouring villages include Boughton, Fincham, Crimplesham, West Dereham, Wretton and Stoke Ferry.

History
The villages name means 'Homestead/village on the River Wigor' or 'hemmed-in land by the River Wigor'. Wigor may be an older name for the River Wissey.

The former Benedictine alien priory of St Winwaloe is now Winnold House. It lies a mile north of the village. A large fair was held on St Winnold's Day (3 March); the fair moved to Downham Market in 1798.

In the centre of the village is the pond - known locally as the pit. Nearby on the village green, the village sign depicts 'Billy the Seal', one of Wereham's most famous residents from the 1920s.

Facilities
Wereham once had four pubs: the George and Dragon, The Crown, The Nags Head and The Chequers; however, only the George and Dragon remains. The village also had a school which closed in the 1980s.

The Parish Church, dedicated to St Margaret of Antioch, is in the centre of the village.

2018 will see the completion of the 1st UK Passivhaus village hall www.werehamvillagehall.co.uk Passivhaus buildings provide a high level of occupant comfort while using very little energy for heating and cooling.

References

External links 

GENUKI page
The Wereham Category of the Group 4 News Website.
The Wereham Category of the Stoke Ferry Website includes Parish Council meeting minutes.

King's Lynn and West Norfolk
Villages in Norfolk
Civil parishes in Norfolk